Guo Fan may refer to:

 Frant Gwo or Guo Fan (郭帆; born 1980), Chinese film director. His most well known film production is "the Wondering Earth" (released in 2019), and its sequel "the Wondering Earth II" (released in 2022). 
 Guo Fan (athlete) (郭凡; born 1985), Chinese athlete